Henryk Młynarczyk (born 25 November 1955 in Krasnystaw) is a Polish politician. He was elected to the Sejm on 25 September 2005, getting 13,633 votes in 7 Chełm district as a candidate from Samoobrona Rzeczpospolitej Polskiej list.

See also
Members of Polish Sejm 2005-2007

External links
Henryk Młynarczyk - parliamentary page - includes declarations of interest, voting record, and transcripts of speeches.

1955 births
Living people
People from Krasnystaw
Members of the Polish Sejm 2005–2007
Self-Defence of the Republic of Poland politicians
Members of the Polish Sejm 2007–2011
AGH University of Science and Technology alumni